David Michael Kennedy (born July 22, 1941) is an American historian specializing in American history. He is the Donald J. McLachlan Professor of History Emeritus at Stanford University and the former Director of the Bill Lane Center for the American West. Kennedy's scholarship is notable for its integration of economic analysis and cultural analysis with social history and political history.

Kennedy is responsible for the recent editions of the popular history textbook The American Pageant. He is also the current editor (since 1999) of the Oxford History of the United States series.  This position was held previously by C. Vann Woodward.  Earlier in his career, Kennedy won the Bancroft Prize for his first book Birth Control in America: The Career of Margaret Sanger (1970), and was a finalist for the Pulitzer Prize for his book World War I, Over Here: The First World War and American Society (1980).  He was the Harold Vyvyan Harmsworth Professor of American History in 1995–1996.  He won the 2000 Pulitzer Prize for History for Freedom from Fear: The American People in Depression and War, 1929–1945 (1999).

Biography
Born on July 22, 1941, in Seattle, Washington, Kennedy received his Bachelor of Arts degree in history from Stanford University and his Master of Arts and Doctor of Philosophy degrees in American studies from Yale University.  He is a fellow of the American Academy of Arts and Sciences.

Kennedy is married and the father of two sons and a daughter.

Books

 Birth Control in America: The Career of Margaret Sanger (1970)
 John Gilmary Shea Prize, 1970
 Bancroft Prize, 1971
 Social Thought in America and Europe, co-editor with Paul A. Robinson (1970)
 Progressivism: The Critical Issues, editor (1971)
 The American People in the Depression (1973)
 The American People in the Age of Kennedy (West Haven: Pendulum Press, 1973)
 The American Pageant: A History of the Republic, co-author with Thomas A. Bailey and Lizabeth Cohen (1979; 14th ed. 2010).
 Over Here: The First World War and American Society (1980)
 Pulitzer Prize Finalist, 1981
 Power and Responsibility: Case Studies in American Leadership, co-editor with Michael Parrish (1986)
 The American Spirit: United States History as Seen by Contemporaries, co-editor with Thomas A. Bailey (1983)
 Freedom From Fear: The American People in Depression and War, 1929–1945 (1999) (Vol. 9 in The Oxford History of the United States)

Awards and honors
 Member of the American Academy of Arts and Sciences, 1996
Pulitzer Prize, 2000
 Francis Parkman Prize, 2000
 Ambassador Book Award, 2000
 California Gold Medal for Literature, 2000
Member of the American Philosophical Society, 2001

See also
 Wayne S. Vucinich

References

External links
 
 

21st-century American historians
21st-century American male writers
American textbook writers
Historians of the United States
1941 births
Living people
Pulitzer Prize for History winners
Stanford University alumni
Stanford University Department of History faculty
Yale Graduate School of Arts and Sciences alumni
Harold Vyvyan Harmsworth Professors of American History
Bancroft Prize winners
2020 United States presidential electors
California Democrats
American male non-fiction writers
Members of the American Philosophical Society